The Writers Guild of America Award for Television: Comedy Series is an award presented by the Writers Guild of America to the writers of the best television comedy series of the season. It has been awarded since the 58th Annual Writers Guild of America Awards in 2006. The year indicates when each season aired.

Winners and nominees

2000s

2010s

2020s

Total awards by network
HBO – 5
NBC – 4
FX – 4
ABC – 2
Prime Video – 1

Total nominations by network
 HBO – 27
 NBC - 19
 Netflix - 8
 FX - 8
 ABC - 6
 Fox - 5
 Hulu – 5
 Prime Video - 5
Apple TV+ - 2
 Showtime - 2
Comedy Central - 1
HBO Max - 2

Programs with multiple awards
3 awards
30 Rock (NBC) (consecutive)
Veep (HBO)

2 awards
Louie (FX)
Modern Family (ABC) (consecutive)

Programs with multiple nominations

8 nominations
30 Rock (NBC)
Curb Your Enthusiasm (HBO)

6 nominations
The Office (NBC)
Veep (HBO)

5 nominations
Modern Family (ABC)

4 nominations
Entourage (HBO)
Silicon Valley (HBO)

3 nominations
Barry (HBO)
Louie (FX)
Parks and Recreation (NBC)
Transparent (Amazon)

2 nominations
Arrested Development (Fox)
Atlanta (FX)
Glee (Fox)
GLOW (Netflix)
Hacks (HBO Max)
The Marvelous Mrs. Maisel (Amazon)
Only Murders in the Building (Hulu)
Orange Is the New Black (Netflix)
PEN15 (Hulu)
Ted Lasso (Apple TV+)
Unbreakable Kimmy Schmidt (Netflix)
What We Do in the Shadows (FX)

References

Comedy Series